Elm Hill, also known as the Campbell-Bloch House, is a historic house and national historic district located near Wheeling, Ohio County, West Virginia. The district includes two contributing buildings and one contributing site. The main house was built about 1850, and is a -story, brick house with a low 2-story wing in the Greek Revival style.  It has an L-shaped plan, a 3-bay entrance portico, and hipped roof with an octagonal bell-cast central cupola. The interior has a central formal hall plan. Also on the property are a contributing brick, spring house / smoke house and a small cemetery dating to about 1835.

It was listed on the National Register of Historic Places in 1991.

References

Houses in Wheeling, West Virginia
Houses on the National Register of Historic Places in West Virginia
Historic districts in Wheeling, West Virginia
Greek Revival houses in West Virginia
Houses completed in 1850
National Register of Historic Places in Wheeling, West Virginia
Historic districts on the National Register of Historic Places in West Virginia